Christian Matte (born January 20, 1975) is a Canadian former professional ice hockey right winger who played briefly in the NHL with the Colorado Avalanche and Minnesota Wild.

Playing career
As a youth, Matte played in the 1988 Quebec International Pee-Wee Hockey Tournament with the a minor ice hockey team from Hull, Quebec.

Matte first played competitive major junior hockey with Abitibi Forestiers in the Quebec QAAA before moving on the Granby Bisons in the QMJHL. In his first season in 1992–93 he complied 53 points in 68 games to be named in the QMJHL All-Rookie Team. Matte was consequently drafted by the Quebec Nordiques in the 6th round, 153rd overall in the 1993 NHL Entry Draft. After being drafted Matte reported back to the Bisons and played another two years with the team developing a strong scoring touch earning a place in the QMJHL Second All-Star team and scoring 50 goals and 116 points in 66 games his final year there. For the 1995–96 season Matte turned pro and joined the Cornwall Aces in the AHL. The following year the Nordiques relocated to Colorado and Matte joined the Hershey Bears who became the Avalanche's new minor league affiliate. That same season Matte also made his NHL debut and played in 5 games with the Avalanche.

Matte then played the majority of the next three years with the Bears. In the 1999–2000 season, his last within the Avalanche organization, Matte scored an impressive 104 points in 73 games with Hershey to be awarded the John B. Sollenberger Trophy as the AHL leading scorer. Despite averaging more than a point per game in the minors Matte was not able to crack the Avalanche lineup and never played more than 7 games in a season with the Avalanche. For the 2000–01 season Matte signed as a free agent with the newly formed Minnesota Wild where he would have a better chance of cracking the starting lineup. However, Matte played only three games with the Wild before being sent to the Cleveland Lumberjacks of the IHL for the remainder of the season, leading the IHL in scoring with 38 goals. The next year Matte signed with the Buffalo Sabres but never played a game with them, instead playing with their minor league affiliate Rochester Americans. From the 2002–03 season until the 2003–04 season Matte played in Switzerland before retiring.

Career statistics

Awards and honours

References

External links

1975 births
Living people
Canadian ice hockey right wingers
Cleveland Lumberjacks players
Colorado Avalanche players
Cornwall Aces players
GCK Lions players
Granby Bisons players
HC Ambrì-Piotta players
Hershey Bears players
Minnesota Wild players
Quebec Nordiques draft picks
Rochester Americans players
ZSC Lions players
Ice hockey people from Gatineau